Martin Toccaferro is a 1953 Italian comedy film directed by Leonardo De Mitri and starring Peppino De Filippo, Titina De Filippo and Wanda Osiris.

Cast
 Peppino De Filippo as Martino Lazzari  
 Titina De Filippo as Miss Costanzi 
 Wanda Osiris as Miss Baroni  
 Umberto Spadaro as Mr. Costanzi  
 Angelika Hauff as Marilu Costanzi
 Ave Ninchi 
 Umberto Melnati 
 Irene Genna 
 Andreina Paul 
 Virgilio Riento 
 Lauro Gazzolo 
 Silvana Jachino 
 Nerio Bernardi 
 Felga Lauri 
 Arturo Bragaglia 
 Mario Cappello 
 Giuseppe Marzari 
 Anna Maria Lupi 
 Enrico Viarisio 
 Cesare Bettarini 
 Clara Bindi 
 Nino Milano 
 Carlo Tusco 
 Franco Ruggeri 
 Olga Michilli 
 Lia Angeleri 
 Enrico Ardizzone 
 Alberto Sorrentino 
 Silvana Stefanini 
 Amleto Pannocchia 
 Pietro Carloni 
 Gianna Cobelli 
 Arnaldo Bertelli

References

Bibliography
 Goble, Alan. The Complete Index to Literary Sources in Film. Walter de Gruyter, 1999.

External links

1953 films
Italian comedy films
1953 comedy films
1950s Italian-language films
Films directed by Leonardo De Mitri
Italian black-and-white films
1950s Italian films